A spasm is a sudden involuntary contraction of a muscle, a group of muscles, or a hollow organ such as the bladder.

A spasmodic muscle contraction may be caused by many medical conditions, including dystonia. Most commonly, it is a muscle cramp which is accompanied by a sudden burst of pain. A muscle cramp is usually harmless and ceases after a few minutes. It is typically caused by ion imbalance or muscle overload.

There are other causes of involuntary muscle contractions, and some of these may cause a health problem.

Description and causes
Various kinds of involuntary muscle activity may be referred to as a "spasm".

A spasm may be a muscle contraction caused by abnormal nerve stimulation or by abnormal activity of the muscle itself.

A spasm may lead to muscle strains or tears in tendons and ligaments if the force of the spasm exceeds the tensile strength of the underlying connective tissue. This can occur with a particularly strong spasm or with weakened connective tissue.

A hypertonic muscle spasm is a condition of chronic, excessive muscle tone (i.e., tension in a resting muscle). This is the amount of contraction that remains when a muscle is not working. A true hypertonic spasm is caused by malfunctioning feedback nerves. This is much more serious and is permanent unless treated. In this case, the hypertonic muscle tone is excessive, and the muscles are unable to relax.

A subtype of spasm is colic. This is an episodic pain caused by spasm of smooth muscle in a particular organ (e.g., the bile duct). A characteristic of colic is the sensation of having to move about, and the pain may induce nausea or vomiting.

See also

 Antispasmodic
 Blepharospasm
 Cadaveric spasm
 Convulsion
 Cramp
 Cricopharyngeal spasm
 Ejaculation
 Epileptic seizure
 Jactitation (medicine)
 Myoclonus
 Neck spasm
 Orgasm
 Spasmodic dysphonia
 Spasticity

References

External links

 NIH Medical Encyclopedia
 How Stuff Works
 

Symptoms and signs: Nervous and musculoskeletal systems